The 1999 Purefoods Tender Juicy Hotdogs season was the 12th season of the franchise in the Philippine Basketball Association (PBA).

Draft pick

Occurrences
Former Pepsi and Sunkist coach Derrick Pumaren is the new head coach of the team beginning the league's 25th season, Pumaren replaces Chito Narvasa on the Purefoods bench.

Seven games into the All-Filipino Cup eliminations, Purefoods' direct-hire recruit, Fil-American Alvarado Segova played his first game against Barangay Ginebra Kings.  Segova didn't last long in the league and was soon deported after being found out to be a fake Filipino.

Roster

Team Manager: Teodoro Dimayuga

Transactions

Trades

References

Magnolia Hotshots seasons
Purefoods